Colymbetini is a tribe of predaceous diving beetles in the family Dytiscidae. There are about 11 genera and more than 160 described species in Colymbetini.

Genera
These 11 genera belong to the tribe Colymbetini:
 Bunites Spangler, 1972
 Caperhantus
 Carabdytes Balke, Hendrich & Wewalka, 1992
 Colymbetes Clairville, 1806
 Hoperius Fall, 1927
 Meladema Laporte, 1835
 Melanodytes Seidlitz, 1887
 Meridiorhantus Balke, Hajek & Hendrich, 2017
 Nartus
 Neoscutopterus J. Balfour-Browne, 1943
 Rhantus Dejean, 1833

References

Further reading

External links

 

Dytiscidae
Articles created by Qbugbot